As a regional grouping, the European Union (EU) remains Malaysia's largest source of foreign direct investment with a total investment inflow of $US13.6 billion (A$14.02 billion) last year, mainly in manufacturing.

Negotiations for a Free Trade Agreement (FTA) between the EU and Malaysia were launched in 2010 and put on hold after seven rounds in 2012 at the request of Malaysia. A stocktaking exercise took place in 2016–17 to assess the prospect to resume negotiations. In the aftermath of the general elections in Malaysia in May 2018, the new government has yet to take a position on the possible resumption of negotiations.

References

External links 
 FTA Malaysia - Free Trade Agreement Malaysia

Free trade agreements of Malaysia
Treaties of Malaysia
Proposed free trade agreements
Treaties entered into by the European Union